A glen is a valley, typically one that is long, deep, and often glacially U-shaped, usually in Scotland.

Glen may also refer to:

People
Glen (given name)
Glen (surname)

Places
River Glen (disambiguation); covering "Glen (river)", "River Glen" and "Glen River"

Canada
Glen Island, Nunavut

India
Glen, Shimla, Himachal Pradesh

Ireland
Glen, Ballyloughloe, a townland in Ballyloughloe civil parish, barony of Clonlonan, County Westmeath
Glen, County Donegal
Glen, Rathgarve, a townland in Rathgarve civil parish, barony of Fore, County Westmeath

Northern Ireland
Glen, County Fermanagh, a townland
Glens of Antrim, also "The Glens"

Scotland
The Glen, Scottish Borders, aka Glen House, ancestral home of Baron Glenconner and the Tennant family

United States
Forest Glen, Chicago, Illinois
Glen, Mississippi
Glen, Montana
Glen, Nebraska
Glen, New Hampshire
Glen, New York
The Glen, a nickname for Watkins Glen International race circuit

Vehicles
NBR Glen Class, a class of steam locomotive on the North British Railway
Glen Class, a Dublin Bay one-design dinghy
Yokosuka E14Y, an Imperial Japanese Navy seaplane, codenamed "Glen" by United States forces

Other uses
Gay and Lesbian Equality Network, an Irish gay rights group

See also
Glenn (disambiguation)